El Profesor Hippie  is a 1969  Argentine musical comedy film directed by Fernando Ayala and written by Abel Santacruz which Ayala produced with Héctor Olivera. The film starred Luis Sandrini, Roberto Escalada and Soledad Silveyra. The film premiered on July 31, 1969 in Buenos Aires.

Cast
Luis Sandrini ...  Professor Héctor 'Tito' Montesano 
Roberto Escalada   
Soledad Silveyra ...  Nélida Echeverría 
Oscar Orlegui   
Alita Román   
Eduardo Muñoz   
Perla Santalla   
Zelmar Gueñol   
Carlos López Monet   
Flora Steinberg   
David Tonelli   
Pablo Alarcón ...  Demateis 
Isidro Fernán Valdez   
Marcia Bell

External links
 

1969 films
1960s Spanish-language films
1969 musical comedy films
Films directed by Fernando Ayala
Films with screenplays by Abel Santa Cruz
Argentine musical comedy films
1960s Argentine films